Ján Vlasko (born 11 January 1990) is a Slovak footballer who plays as an attacking midfielder for Skalica.

Club career
Born in Bojnice, Vlasko began playing youth football for Prievidza. He also played for the youth sides of Sparta Prague and Dubnica.

In 2007, Vlasko joined Czech Gambrinus liga side Slovan Liberec. He made his professional debut for Slovan Liberec, entering as a second-half substitute against Sparta Prague, in May 2007.

He joined Spartak Trnava in August 2012 and made his debut for them against Žilina on 21 August 2012.

Zagłębie Lubin bought Vlasko in July 2015 for a fee of €0.18 million.

Honours 
Spartak Trnava
 Fortuna Liga: 2017–18
 Slovnaft Cup: 2021–22

References

External links
 
 FC Spartak Trnava profile 
 

1990 births
Living people
Sportspeople from Bojnice
Association football midfielders
Slovak footballers
FC Baník Prievidza players
AC Sparta Prague players
FK Dubnica players
FC Slovan Liberec players
FK Senica players
Zagłębie Lubin players
Puskás Akadémia FC players
MFK Skalica players
Ekstraklasa players
Slovak Super Liga players
Czech First League players
Nemzeti Bajnokság I players
Slovak expatriate footballers
Expatriate footballers in the Czech Republic
Slovak expatriate sportspeople in the Czech Republic
Expatriate footballers in Poland
Slovak expatriate sportspeople in Poland
Expatriate footballers in Hungary
Slovak expatriate sportspeople in Hungary